Mordellistenula lacinicollis is a beetle in the genus Mordellistenula of the family Mordellidae. It was described in 1990 by Csetó.

References

Mordellidae
Beetles described in 1990